The Exe Valley Railway was a branch line built by the Great Western Railway (GWR) in Devon, England, to link its Bristol to Exeter line with its Devon and Somerset Railway (D&SR), thereby connecting Exeter with  (which is in Somerset). The line was in use from 1884 until 1964.

History
It opened on 1 August 1884. This opened on 1 May 1885.

Trains could not stop at Stoke Canon station as the junction was built south of the station which had been opened on the main line in 1852. This was rectified in 1894 when a new station was built to the south of the junction.

In 1890, Mrs Towns was appointed signalwoman at Morebath Junction. She is the only recorded example of a signalwoman on any railway in Britain in the 19th century. In October 1913, the Railway Magazine reported that she was "very proud" of her job after 23 years service and hoped to continue indefinitely.

On 1 January 1948, the GWR was nationalised to become the Western Region of British Railways. Stoke Canon station closed in 1960 and passenger trains were withdrawn from the line from 7 October 1963, although goods trains continued to run to Thorverton until 4 May 1964.

Stations

The stations are described from north to south. They all closed on 7 October 1963 unless stated otherwise.

Bampton
Bampton station opened on 1 August 1884 on the west side of Bampton. South West England. It was a passing place so had two platforms for passengers and also a goods shed. It dispatched a lot of stone from local quarries. It was renamed "Bampton (Devon)" in June 1911 to avoid confusion with another GWR Bampton station in Oxfordshire. After the line closed the station was demolished, and the cutting in which it was situated was largely filled in.

Cove Halt
This was the first of the small stations that were opened along the line during the 1920s. A siding had been provided when the line opened near the level crossing in the village of Cove, and a simple platform with a corrugated iron pagoda shelter was opened for passengers on 9 June 1924. The level crossing keeper had a cottage and small signal cabin, both of which have survived as a house.

Bolham Halt
Another small station, this concrete platform was opened on 23 April 1928. It had a corrugated iron shelter with a simple sloping roof. It served the village of Bolham.

Tiverton

It was reconstructed with extra platforms in the 1880s to accommodate the Exe Valley trains.

After the closure of the Stoke Canon to Morebath line, Tiverton continued to be served from Tiverton Junction until 5 October 1964 (passengers) and 5 June 1967 (goods).

West Exe Halt
This station was opened on 19 March 1928 to serve the western side of Tiverton and Heathcoat's Mill, a major employer in the town. It was equipped with a wooden shelter, and the original  platform was almost doubled in length in May 1937. It was generally unstaffed, but at busy times a porter was sometimes sent from Tiverton to collect and sell tickets Tiverton station continued to be served from  until 5 October 1964 (passengers) and 5 June 1967 (goods).

Cadeleigh
This station opened on 1 May 1885 to serve the villages of Cadeleigh and Bickleigh and was therefore known as 'Cadeleigh and Bickleigh' until 1 May 1906 when it was changed to just 'Cadeleigh'. As a passing place it had two platforms and also a busy goods yard. After the railway was closed it was used by the county council, but in 1997 it was sold and is now used as the Devon Railway Centre.

Burn Halt
This small platform with a wooden shelter was opened on 26 January 1929 to serve Burn Farm and the parish of Butterleigh.

Up Exe
When the line opened in 1885 a platform was provided on the east side of the track near the hamlet of Up Exe with the name 'Up Exe and Silverton', although a Silverton railway station already existed on the Bristol to Exeter line to serve that village. From 1 May 1905 the Exe Valley station was renamed 'Up Exe'. It was provided with a small stone building for passenger use and a house for the station master, although it never had a goods yard. A small signal box was provided next to the level crossing.

From 1 October 1923 the staff were withdrawn from the station and it was designated 'Up Exe Halt'. The station master's house was then used by the level crossing keeper, and the station buildings became a house while the passengers were given a small iron shelter. Both the house remained in use as such after the closure of the line.

Thorverton
The station serving Thorverton village opened with the railway in 1885. Two platforms were provided as it was a passing place. The main buildings and goods yard were on the southbound side, while a wooden shelter was provided on the opposite platform for passengers travelling towards Tiverton. The station master had a house to the north of the station. The village was not on a main road and had no bus service with the result that the station was one of the best-used on the line and also generated a lot of freight due to nearby Thorverton Mill, a watermill that was connected to the station by a siding. Camp coaches were based here from 1936 to 1939 which provided accommodation for holiday visitors.

Thorverton closed to passenger traffic with the rest of the Exe Valley line on 7 October 1963. Goods traffic ceased on 4 May 1964. Both the station and the stationmaster's house remain in use as houses, the former extended using stone from the demolished goods shed.

Brampford Speke
The station at Brampford Speke was a single platform on the west side of the line that opened with the line in 1885. Unusually there was no road access, passengers reached the station via a footpath from the village.  It was provided with the usual building for passengers and a house for the station master. It had a signal box until 1907 but never any goods yard. It was closed for the whole of 1917 and 1918 as a wartime economy measure. From 1 October 1923 the staff were withdrawn and the station designated 'Brampford Speke Halt'. As at Up Exe, the station building became a house and passengers used an iron shelter instead. Both this and the station master's house continue to be used as private houses.  As of 2021-07-05, this was listed as on sale, and the original station can still be clearly distinguished.

Services
This example timetable shows the weekday passenger services in October 1920 (there was no service on Sundays).

References

Bibliography

Further reading

Rail transport in Devon
Rail transport in Somerset
Railway lines opened in 1884
Railway lines closed in 1963